The Great Journey Album is the second studio album from Japanese girl group Empire. It was released on December 18, 2019, by Avex Trax. The album consists of ten tracks.

Track listing

Charts

References

2019 albums
Empire (Japanese band) albums
Japanese-language albums